SS Arthur M. Anderson is a cargo ship of the laker type. She is famous for being the last ship to be in contact with  before she sank on November 10, 1975. Arthur M. Anderson was also the first rescue ship on the scene in a vain search for Edmund Fitzgerald survivors. The vessel's namesake, Arthur Marvin Anderson, was director of U.S. Steel, a member of its finance committee and vice chairman of J.P. Morgan & Co. at the time. The ship was launched in 1952 and is in active service.

History 

SS Arthur M. Anderson came out of the drydock of the American Ship Building Company of Lorain, Ohio in 1952. Arthur M. Anderson, along with Philip R. Clarke and Cason J. Callaway, were built for the Pittsburgh Steamship Division of U.S. Steel. Arthur M. Andersons sea trials commenced on August 7, 1952, and she loaded her first cargo at the Two Harbors dock on August 12, 1952. She received several refits in her life including the addition of a new  midsection in 1975 which added about 6,000 tons to her gross tonnage, bringing the total to about 26,000 tons. In 1981 she received a self unloading boom which improved her cargo loading and unloading. She is unique among the three Great Lakes Fleet steamships in that she has a softer midsection that prohibits loading as much cargo as the others; roughly 1500 tons less.

In February 2015 Arthur M. Anderson became stuck and stranded in several feet of ice in Lake Erie near Conneaut Harbor, Ohio.

Arthur M. Anderson was put on long-term lay-up in Duluth, Minnesota on January 15, 2017, at the end of the 2016 shipping season. In April 2019, she was transferred to the nearby Fraser Shipyards for a five-month survey and refitting to prepare for her return to service. The vessel returned to service on July 25, 2019.

Notes

References

External links 

 AIS Tracking of SS Arthur M. Anderson via marinetraffic.com
 sailwx.info: Arthur M Anderson current position and weather

Great Lakes freighters
Merchant ships of the United States
1952 ships
Ships built in Lorain, Ohio